Steve Requin (born Stéphane Johnson, July 21, 1968) is a Canadian cartoonist from Beloeil, Quebec.

Biography
Steve Requin started publishing comics in 1988 for a French Canadian pop music magazine called Wow !, comics that he signed under the pseudonym Jon-Son.

In December 1994 he adopted the name Steve Requin and founded Les Publications Requin Roll for which he created and published many underground magazines such as Requin Roll and Les Plagiats de la BD. In 1999, he founded MensuHell, Québec's longest monthly underground comics magazine. MensuHell'''s ownership has been passed to Francis Hervieux in 2002, who kept publishing it until issue No. 109, dated December 2008. Steve closed down Les Publications Requin Roll in January 2003.

From November 2001 to November 2008, Steve has been a writer and artist for Safarir, Québec's answer to the American magazine Mad. He mostly wrote and/or drew parodies of TV shows and movies, but he is also known for comics series such as Malice (drawn by Serge Boisvert DeNevers) and Konar.

In 2017, at the Festival de la bande dessinée francophone de Québec, he received the Jacques-Hurtubise award for his comic project, La Clique Vidéo.

Bibliography

Periodical publications
Magazines
 Wow !, pop music magazine, 1988–1989
 Zine Zag, 100% comics, 1998–2004
 Safarir, Québec's illustrated humour magazine, 2001–2008

Fanzines
 MensuHell, Montréal underground comics 1999–2002
 Requin Roll, Montréal underground comics 1994–1999
 Les Plagiats de la BD, Montréal underground comics 1997–1999

See also

 Bande dessinée
 Canadian comics
 Quebec comic strips

References
 Beyond the funnies

Bibliography and sources
 BDQ, Répertoire des publications de bandes dessinées au Québec des origines à nos jours, 1999, Michel Viau, éditions Mille-Îles, Laval
 Histoire de la bande dessinée au Québec'', 2008, Mira Falardeau, VLB éditeur, Études québécoises collection, Montréal

External links
  Steve Requin on IMDb
  deviantART (gallery of the artist)

1968 births
Living people
Artists from Montreal
Canadian writers in French
Canadian comics artists
Canadian comics writers
Writers from Montreal
People from Beloeil, Quebec